Marganlar ( is a city in Qarah Quyun District of Showt County, West Azerbaijan province, Iran. At the 2006 census, its population (as the constituent villages merged to later form the city) was 2,423 in 533 households. The following census in 2011 counted 2,247 people in 615 households, by which time the villages of Margan-e Azizabad, Margan-e Esmail Kandi, Margan-e Qadim, and Margan-e Vasat had merged to form the new city of Marganlar. The latest census in 2016 showed a population of 2,294 people in 642 households.

References 

Showt County

Cities in West Azerbaijan Province

Populated places in West Azerbaijan Province

Populated places in Showt County

fa:مرگنلر